Atrytonopsis python, known generally as the python skipper or annual sea-blite, is a species of grass skipper in the butterfly family Hesperiidae. It is found in North America.

The MONA or Hodges number for Atrytonopsis python is 4086.

Subspecies
These two subspecies belong to the species Atrytonopsis python:
 Atrytonopsis python margarita Skinner, 1913
 Atrytonopsis python python

References

Further reading

 

Hesperiinae
Articles created by Qbugbot
Butterflies described in 1882